Tim Wu (born November 10, 1989), better known by his stage name Elephante, is an American musician, DJ and music producer based in Los Angeles.

Early life 
Wu was born in Ann Arbor, Michigan. His parents were born in Taipei, Taiwan and moved to the United States in their 20s. He is based in Los Angeles. He started to play music at an early age and taught himself to play guitar and was trained to play classical piano. He majored in economics at Harvard University. In 2011, he graduated and wanted to involve himself in the music industry as an acoustic singer-songwriter before he moved on to electronic dance music.

Wu began using "Elephante" as a stage name because it was a reference to the phrase "elephant in the room" which he described as his unhappiness of working at a corporate job since he wanted to be a musician.

Musical style 
Wu describes his music as melodic electronic music that fuses with various other genres.

His preferred genres are big room, progressive house and regularly incorporates pop and trap into his music. His songs have been played on streaming services such as SoundCloud for over a million times. Trap high-hats, deep house elements and house synths are incorporated into his melodic sounds. Wu has quoted Skrillex to be his inspiration in music, citing "Scary Monsters and Nice Sprites" astonished him.

Wu uses Ableton Live as his digital audio workstation and previously used GarageBand, FruityLoops and Pro Tools. He remixed songs for artists such as Calvin Harris, Galantis, The Chainsmokers, Jack Ü and Zedd.

Career

2014: SERC Fall Concert 
In October 2014, Wu performed at SERC Fall Concert alongside Sage the Gemini.

2015: Beginnings 
Wu started his career by remixing music for artists before began releasing original songs. His first single was self-released, titled "Temporary Love" which features the vocals of Brooke Forman. He released his first single through Armada Records titled "I Want You" featuring Rumors. He opened for headliners Deorro and MAKJ at the 2015 Echostage in June.

2016: Debut extended play 
In 2016, he released his debut extended play titled "I Am the Elephante". The EP consists of nine songs of progressive house, synthpop and trap. He released a single titled "Age of Innocence" featuring Trouze and Damon Sharp. The song peaked on Billboard's Dance/Club chart at 18th and received over a million plays on Spotify. His single "Closer" featuring Bishop had peaked on the Spotify 'Viral 50' chart at 27th. Spotify 'Velocity' has "Closer" and another single titled "Plans" featuring Brandyn Burnette charted at 22nd and 28th respectively. The third single "Hold" from the EP was released, it features American singer Jessica Jarrell.

2018 - present: Glass Mansion 
On 15 June 2018, Wu released his second EP, titled Glass Mansion. The nine-track extended play includes the previously released singles "Troubled", "Come Back for You", "The In Between" and "Have It All". The EP reached number one on iTunes in the US Dance album category. Compared to his previous release, Wu takes a stripped-back approach on this extended play, with songs featuring more light guitar melodies than electronic instrumentals.

Describing the EP on Twitter, Elephante said it is about "realizing that no matter how beautiful and strong what we build is, it's ultimately fragile and one stone could bring it all down. It's about coming to peace with the fact that it all might never be finished, and that's okay. It's about realizing that our Glass Mansion isn't the answer to all our problems, and it's about the journey of finding grace and happiness in a half-built home." In October 2019, he announced a live tour titled the "Diamond Days Tour", which is based on his single of the same name and dubbed the "natural evolution" of his evolving live shows.

Discography

Albums

Extended plays

Singles

Remixes

2013 
 Kaskade and Project 46 – "Last Chance" (Elephante Remix)
 The Unlikely Candidates – "Follow My Feet" (Elephante Remix)

2014 
 AYER – "Young" (Elephante Remix)
 Katy Perry featuring Juicy J – "Dark Horse" (Elephante Remix)
 The Chainsmokers – "#Selfie" (Elephante Remix)
 Lorde – "Team" (Elephante Remix)
 Afrojack featuring Wrabel – "Ten Feet Tall" (Elephante Remix)
 Calvin Harris – "Summer" (Elephante Remix)
 Galantis – "Help" (Elephante Remix)
 Clean Bandit – "Rather Be" (Elephante Remix)
 Oliver Heldens – "Gecko" (Elephante Remix)
 Sander van Doorn, Martin Garrix and DVBBS – "Gold Skies" (Elephante Remix)
 Lemaitre – "Wait" (Elephante Remix)
 Dirty South – "Unbreakable" (Elephante Remix)
 Penguin Prison – "Calling Out" (Elephante Remix)

2015 
 The Magician featuring Years & Years – "Sunlight" (Elephante Remix)
 Jack Ü featuring Justin Bieber – "Where Are Ü Now" (Elephante Remix)
 Oh, Be Clever – "Next To You" (Elephante Remix)
 Zedd featuring Selena Gomez – "I Want You To Know" (Elephante Remix)
 Phoebe Ryan – "Mine" (Elephante Remix)
 Deluka – "Home" (Elephante Remix)
 Jason Derulo – "Cheyenne" (Elephante Remix)
 Mako – "Smoke Filled Room" (Elephante Remix)
 Nathan Sykes – "Over And Over Again" (Elephante Remix)
 Miia – "Dynasty" (Elephante Remix)

2016 
 Stephen – "Crossfire" (Elephante Remix)
 Bebe Rexha – "No Broken Hearts" (Elephante Remix)
 Nathan Sykes – "Famous" (Elephante Remix)

2018 
 Elephante featuring Anjulie – "The In Between" (Elephante "Zoo" Remix)

References

External links 
 Official website
 Elephante on Discogs

Living people
1989 births
American DJs
Electronic musicians
Progressive house musicians
Electronic dance music DJs
Harvard College alumni
Musicians from Ann Arbor, Michigan